This page documents the tornadoes and tornado outbreaks of 1997, primarily in the United States. Most tornadoes form in the U.S., although some events may take place internationally. Tornado statistics for older years like this often appear significantly lower than modern years due to fewer reports or confirmed tornadoes, however by the 1990s tornado statistics were coming closer to the numbers we see today.

Synopsis

The 1997 tornado season was largely defined by two tornado events. The first was a major outbreak on March 1 that resulted in 27 fatalities, 25 of which were in Arkansas. The second was a brutal, slow-moving F5 twister that struck the small town of Jarrell, Texas on May 27 killing 27 people and leaving behind some of the most extreme tornado damage ever seen.

Events
Confirmed tornado total for the entire year 1997 in the United States.

January
There were 70 tornadoes confirmed in the US in January.

January 23–24

A tornado outbreak in January produced 16 tornadoes in the Deep South. Damage from the tornadoes totaled around $16.771 million and 43 people were injured. An F2 tornado struck Tuscaloosa, Alabama on January 24, resulting in the second tornado fatality of the year. The tornado also injured 10 others and damaged up to 100 structures.

February
There were 23 tornadoes confirmed in the US in February.

February 28 – March 1

A major tornado outbreak struck portions of the central and southern United States on March 1, with the initial activity beginning on February 28. Affecting areas mostly from Arkansas to Kentucky, the two-day outbreak produced 39 tornadoes and killed at least 27 people including 25 in Arkansas alone with one death in each Mississippi and Tennessee. This was Arkansas' deadliest tornado outbreak since May 15, 1968, where 34 were killed in Jonesboro. Over 400 others were injured during this event, which was about 45% of the yearly average of tornado-related injuries in the United States.

March
There were 102 tornadoes confirmed in the US in March.

April
There were 114 tornadoes confirmed in the US in April.

May
There were 225 tornadoes confirmed in the US in May.

May 12

A highly visible F1 tornado moved directly through Downtown Miami, Florida. The tornado is remembered not so much for its minor damage, but for its haunting pictures, which made headlines around the world.

May 25–26
A two-day tornado outbreak struck Oklahoma, Texas, and Kansas. F2 tornadoes struck Perth, Kansas, and Duncan, Oklahoma. A stovepipe tornado touched down near the Red River. On May 26, several intense tornadoes struck Oklahoma including a wedge tornado near Preston and another near Beggs.

May 27

An unusual and extremely violent tornado outbreak occurred in Central Texas. The F5 tornado that struck the town of Jarrell, Texas killed 27 of the 1,319 residents. The tornado was 3/4 of a mile (1.2 km) wide and tracked 7.6 miles (12.2 km). Double Creek Estates, a subdivision of Jarrell, was literally wiped off the map with all 38 homes and several mobile homes destroyed.

June
There were 193 tornadoes confirmed in the US in June.

June 11

A tornado outbreak struck the Texas Panhandle. While most of the tornadoes were weak, rated F0 and F1, a large F3 tornado injured 13 people as it passed between McLean and Shamrock. Several other weak tornadoes touched down across parts of Kansas, Colorado, Nebraska, and South Dakota.

July
There were 188 tornadoes confirmed in the US in July.

July 2

A localized, but destructive tornado outbreak occurred in the built-up area of Detroit, Michigan. There were 13 tornadoes in total, three of which hit neighborhoods and downtown, striking northern Detroit between I-96 and Eight Mile Road, Hamtramck and Highland Park. The storms killed seven, caused local flooding, and destroyed houses. Five of the fatalities were recorded in Groose Pointe Farms due to straight-line winds of up to 100 mph that blew a gazebo full of people into Lake St. Clair. One tornado formed east of the Detroit River, causing damage in Essex County, Ontario near Windsor. Four tornadoes were rated F3.

August
There were 84 tornadoes confirmed in the US in August.

September
There were 32 tornadoes confirmed in the US in September.

October
There were 100 tornadoes confirmed in the US in October.

November
There were 25 tornadoes confirmed in the US in November.

December
There were 12 tornadoes confirmed in the US in December.

See also
 Tornado
 Tornadoes by year
 Tornado records
 Tornado climatology
 Tornado myths
 List of tornado outbreaks
 List of F5 and EF5 tornadoes
 List of North American tornadoes and tornado outbreaks
 List of 21st-century Canadian tornadoes and tornado outbreaks
 List of European tornadoes and tornado outbreaks
 List of tornadoes and tornado outbreaks in Asia
 List of Southern Hemisphere tornadoes and tornado outbreaks
 List of tornadoes striking downtown areas
 Tornado intensity
 Fujita scale
 Enhanced Fujita scale

References

External links 
 U.S. tornadoes in 1997 - Tornado History Project
 Storm Data "1997 Annual Summaries" (NCDC)
 US Killer Tornadoes of 1997 (The Tornado Project)
 Tornado deaths monthly (University of Nebraska, Lincoln)

 
1997 meteorology
Tornado-related lists by year
Torn